Keri Phebus (born May 1, 1974) is a professional tennis player from the United States. During her pro career from 1991 to 1998, she won five titles on the ITF Women's Circuit, received a wildcard entry and won her first round match at the 1995 US Open. Phebus is the most decorated player in the history of UCLA women's tennis.

Early career

While a student at Corona del Mar High School, Phebus was the nation's top-ranked girl in juniors for multiple seasons.

College
While at UCLA, she won the Honda Sports Award as the nation's best female tennis player in 1995. In 1995, she was the first UCLA player ever to win the national singles championship and became the second woman in history to win both the NCAA singles and doubles titles in the same year. Phebus was the first women's tennis player inducted into the UCLA Athletics Hall of Fame. No other player has been so decorated in the history of women's tennis at UCLA.

Professional career

In professional tennis, on December 8, 1997, Phebus reached her highest singles ranking: world number 186. Her highest doubles ranking came on January 5, 1998, when she became world number 147. In her career, she won US $46,895.

ITF Women's Singles

Phebus defeated Sweden's Kristina Triska to win the singles title at the ITF $25,000 Woodlands, Texas, on March 23, 1997.

ITF Women's Doubles

In 1997, Phebus partnered with Anne Mall to win the doubles title at the ITF $25,000 Mission, Texas tournament.

In June 1998, at the ITF $25,000 Mount Pleasant, South Carolina, Phebus partnered with Canadian Vanessa Webb to win the doubles title. The pair were runners-up at July's ITF $25,000 tournament in Peachtree, Georgia. The following week, they won the doubles title at the ITF $25,000 Winnipeg.

ITF Circuit finals

Singles finals

Doubles finals

Personal life

Phebus is married to Steve Olsen, has three children, and lives in California. After her playing days she became a school teacher for several years, but has taught tennis at "The Edge Tennis Academy" in Newport Beach since 2013.

References

External links
 
 

1974 births
Living people
American female tennis players
Sportspeople from Pomona, California
UCLA Bruins women's tennis players
Tennis people from California